Carolina (San Luis) is a village and municipality in San Luis Province in central Argentina. It is near the Río Trapiche.

Climate 
During July when the weather is usually the coldest, common temperatures range from 5-18°C. In January when it is hottest the temperature average highs and low ranges from 31°C and drops to 19°C.

References

Populated places in San Luis Province